Shingli bala is a village of Battagram District in Khyber-Pakhtunkhwa province of Pakistan. It is part of Gijbori Union Council and lies within Battagram Tehsil and is located about four kilometres from the district headquarters Battagram along the Karakoram Highway(Shahrah-e-Resham) or silk route, and opposite CPEC Bridge at Kas-Pul area.

The people of Shingli Bala belong to multiple families (khel) including Hasham khel (kochilian)+(Akhonzadgan) (biggest family), Rama khel, Masha khel, Raja khel, Mula Khel, Yawgayan, Tor khel, Syedan and Samla khel.

It is a head village of Deshan Territory.

Demographics 
350+ houses occupy this village.
Shingli bala is a village of Battagram District in Khyber-Pakhtunkhwa province of Pakistan. It is part of Gijbori Union Council and lies within Battagram Tehsil and is located about four kilometres from the district headquarters Battagram along the Karakoram Highway(Shahrah-e-Resham) or silk route.

The people of Shingli Bala belong to multiple families (khel) including Hasham khel (kochilian)+(Akhonzadgan) (biggest family), Rama khel, Masha khel, Raja khel, Mula Khel, Yawgayan, Tor khel, Syedan and Samla khel.

It is a head village of Deshan Territory.

Gallery

See also

 Anis Ur Rahman
 Battagram District
 Battagram Tehsil
 Battagram
 Deshiwal
 Gijbori
 Khyber-Pakhtunkhwa
 Pakistan

References

Villages in Khyber Pakhtunkhwa
Battagram District
Populated places in Battagram District